Sodium fluoride/malic acid (trade name Xerodent) is a type of mouthwash consisting of the teeth-strengthening sodium fluoride and the saliva stimulant malic acid. It is used in xerostomia.

References

Combination drugs